Dark Matter is the title of a 1990 science fiction novel by Garfield Reeves-Stevens. It involves mystery, horror, and physics, and was first published by Doubleday in September 1990.

Notes

1990 novels
American science fiction novels
Doubleday (publisher) books